Aberle is a surname. Notable people with the surname include:

Anton Aberle (1876–1953), German-Swiss architect
Armin Aberle (born 1960), Australian-German scientist
David Aberle (1918–2004), American anthropologist
Elke Aberle (born 1950), German actress
eden ahbez (born George Alexander Aberle; 1908–1995), American songwriter
Helmuth Aberle (born 1969), Austrian footballer
Juan Aberle (1846–1930), Italian conductor and composer
Karl Aberle (1901–1963), German publisher and politician
Moritz von Aberle (1819–1875), German Catholic theologian
Sophie Bledsoe Aberle (1896–1996), American anthropologist, physician and nutritionist